II is the second album by Spanish power metal band Lords of Black, released on 18 March 2016 under Italian record label Frontiers Records.

Track listing

Personnel
 Ronnie Romero – Lead vocals
 Tony Hernando - Guitars, bass, additional keyboards, synths, narrated voices
 Andy C. (Andres Cobos) - Drums, piano

Guest musicians
 Victor Díez - Piano on "New Worlds Comin'", "Tears I Will Be", "Insane (Acoustic Version)"

Production
 Tony Hernando - Production
 Roland Grapow - Co-production, recording, mixing, mastering
 Anti Horrillo, Daniel Luna, and Miguel Sanz - Recording and engineering
 Felipe Machado Franco - Cover art
 Manuel Giménez Caballero - Layout designs
 Antonio Garci - Photography

References

External links
 Discogs.com
 Metallum Archvies

2016 albums
Lords of Black albums